Acatochaeta is a genus of fly in the family Ulidiidae, containing only the single species Acatochaeta africana.

Distribution
Equatorial Guinea.

References

Ulidiidae
Monotypic Brachycera genera
Endemic fauna of Equatorial Guinea
Diptera of Africa
Taxa named by Günther Enderlein